Phoenix is the tenth studio album by British rock band Asia, released in 2008. It was the first studio recording with the original line-up after the reunion in 2006.

Reception 
Phoenix was seen as somewhat polarizing. News and review site Vintagerock was positive towards the album, stating that the band had matured significantly over the years. "Superior musicianship and great songs never go out of style, and while it’s illogical to think Phoenix could ascend to the heights of the group’s debut from 1982, the record succeeds by remaining true to its purpose. If this release is a set up for things to come, then we could be seeing some more new and wondrous music from Asia." Allmusic was also generally positive towards the album, with a 4/5 rating that compared it favorably to Asia's first two albums. On the other hand, Variety criticized it for that very same reason, going on to say that "What’s sorely missing this time out is the pop/rock catchiness of the aforementioned “Heat” and “Only Time Will Tell” which carried the band to unexpected success back in the day. An excess of syrupy Muzak-like ballads such as ”Heroine” and “I Will Remember You” and little actual rock only serve to remind that you not only can’t but really shouldn’t go home again." Glide Magazine also panned the album. "Because Phoenix has practically no redeeming quality, it seems Asia’s debut is to be sadly relegated to something I like despite itself. Phoenix doesn’t even fare that well, because there is simply no pleasure, guilty or otherwise. I guess everything that rises from the ashes isn’t good."

Track listing

Personnel

Asia
 John Wetton – lead and backing vocals, bass guitar
 Steve Howe – electric, acoustic and steel guitars, harmony vocals on "Wish I'd Known All Along"
 Geoff Downes – keyboards
 Carl Palmer – drums, percussion

Additional musician
 Hugh McDowell – cello (on "I Will Remember You" and "An Extraordinary Life")

Technical personnel
 Steve Rispin – co-producer, engineer, mixing engineer (tracks 2, 4, 6, 7, 10, bonus tracks)
 Simon Hanhart – mixing engineer (tracks 1 (European edition), 3, 12)
 Curtis Schwartz – mixing engineer (tracks 5, 8, 9, 11)
 John X. Volaitis – mixing engineer (on "Never Again" (U.S. edition))
 John Dent – mastering engineer (at Loud Mastering, Taunton, Somerset) (European edition)
 Evren Göknar – mastering engineer (at Capitol Mastering, Hollywood, Los Angeles) (U.S. edition)
 Roger Dean – cover logotype, inside painting
 Martyn Dean – computer work, cover design
 Michael Inns – photography
 Karen Gladwell – artwork

Charts

Release history

References

Asia (band) albums
2008 albums
Capitol Records albums
EMI Records albums
Frontiers Records albums
Albums with cover art by Roger Dean (artist)